Rickey W. Thompson (born June 30, 1964) is an American licensed practical nurse and Democratic politician. He is a current member of the Mississippi House of Representatives, having represented the state's 16th House district since 2020.

Biography 
Rickey W. Thompson was born on June 30, 1964, in Shannon, Mississippi. In 2019, he was elected to represent Mississippi's 16th House District (parts of Lee and Monroe Counties) as a Democrat in the Mississippi House of Representatives, and started serving in 2020.

References 

1964 births
Living people
People from Lee County, Mississippi
Democratic Party members of the Mississippi House of Representatives